Tim Means (born February 20, 1984) is an American professional mixed martial artist from Moriarty, New Mexico currently competing in the Welterweight division of the Ultimate Fighting Championship. A professional competitor since 2004, Means has also formerly competed for King of the Cage and Legacy FC. Means is the former King of the Cage Lightweight Champion and the former King of the Cage Junior Welterweight Champion.

Background
Born in Wilburton, Oklahoma, and raised in New Mexico, Means began training at the age of 12, as he was a troubled kid and was taken under the wing of a local trainer. In 2004, Means was involved in a shooting incident outside of a bar and suffered a nine-inch gunshot wound in the femoral artery of his thigh. Means was prescribed painkillers and morphine, and developed a morphine dependency. After Means's prescriptions ran out, he began experimenting with methamphetamine. A few years after Means began using meth, he found himself in trouble with the law, and was charged with aggravated assault after punching a man who broke into his home. After serving more than three years in prison early in his MMA career, Means turned his life around.

Mixed martial arts career

Early career
Means began his MMA career in 2004, recording a 3–2 record before serving a prison sentence. His two losses were to future UFC fighters Spencer Fisher and Luke Caudillo.

King of the Cage
Means returned to MMA in 2009 and reeled off six consecutive victories via first round stoppage, including a nine-second TKO win over Matt Green at KOTC: New Breed. He earned his first title at KOTC: Steel on Oct. 7, 2010 when he defeated Bobby Green to win the KOTC Junior Welterweight (160 lbs) belt. He defended the belt on four occasions, most recently in a first-round TKO victory over Mario Ramos at KOTC: High Performance on Nov. 19, 2011.  He added the KOTC Lightweight title with a victory over Tye Brown at KOTC: Total Destruction on Jan. 21, 2012.

Ultimate Fighting Championship
Means made his UFC debut on February 15, 2012, defeating Bernardo Magalhaes by unanimous decision at UFC on Fuel TV 1.

Means overwhelmed Justin Salas on June 8, 2012, at UFC on FX 3, knocking him down multiple times before finishing him with punches in just over a minute.

Means was expected to face promotional newcomer Abel Trujillo on September 1, 2012, at UFC 151.  However, after UFC 151 was cancelled, the bout was rescheduled for December 8, 2012, at UFC on Fox 5. On the day of the weigh-ins for the event, Means fell in a hotel sauna, injuring his head, and was replaced by Marcus LeVesseur.

Means lost a unanimous decision to Jorge Masvidal on April 20, 2013, at UFC on Fox 7.

Means, replacing an injured Bobby Green, lost a unanimous decision to Danny Castillo on July 27, 2013, at UFC on Fox 8, and was subsequently released from UFC.

Legacy FC
After his release from the UFC, Means was called to replace Danny Salinas in the main event against Pete Spratt on September 13, 2013, at Legacy FC 23. He won via first-round knockout. The win was not without controversy, as after the event Pete Spratt in an interview later claimed that it in the combination that knocked him out, the elbow had knocked him down but it was the follow up punches to the back head, which are illegal, that knocked him out, and expressed he would appeal the decision. Means manager Tom Vaughn when asked for statement didn't respond for comment to the allegations.

Means then defeated Artenas Young via first-round technical knockout at Legacy FC 27, on January 31, 2014.

UFC return
Following two wins on the regional circuit, Means was re-signed by the UFC and lost a unanimous decision to Neil Magny in a welterweight bout on May 10, 2014, at UFC Fight Night 40, replacing William Macário.

Means beat Hernani Perpetuo by unanimous decision on July 26, 2014, at UFC on Fox 12.

Means won a split decision over Márcio Alexandre on December 20, 2014, at UFC Fight Night 58.

Means earned a Performance of the Night bonus for defeating Dhiego Lima via TKO in the first round on February 28, 2015, at UFC 184.

Means, replacing an injured Kenny Robertson, defeated George Sullivan via submission (arm-triangle choke) in round three on April 18, 2015, at UFC on Fox 15.

Means faced Matt Brown on July 11, 2015, at UFC 189. Despite finding some success via striking early in the fight, Means lost the fight by submission due to a guillotine choke.

Means faced John Howard on December 10, 2015, at UFC Fight Night 80. He won the fight via knockout in the second round. The win also earned Means his second Performance of the Night bonus award.

Means was expected to face Donald Cerrone on February 21, 2016, at UFC Fight Night 83. However, Means was pulled from the fight as a result of a violation of the USADA anti-doping policy. He was replaced by Alex Oliveira.

At the conclusion of his suspension, Means was expected to face Sean Strickland on August 20, 2016, at UFC 202. However Strickland pulled out of the fight in early August citing a knee injury. He was replaced by promotional newcomer Sabah Homasi. Means defeated Homasi by technical knockout in the second round.

Means faced Alex Oliveira on December 30, 2016, at UFC 207. The bout was halted in the first round after Means landed several knees to the head of Oliveira while he was considered a grounded opponent. As a result, Oliveira was unable to continue after the foul occurred. Subsequently, referee Dan Miragliotta judged that the foul was accidental, and in turn, the result was scored a no contest.

A rematch with Oliveira eventually took place on March 11, 2017, at UFC Fight Night 106. Means lost the fight via submission in the second round.

Means faced Alex Garcia on June 25, 2017, at UFC Fight Night 112. He won by unanimous decision.

Means faced Belal Muhammad on November 19, 2017, at UFC Fight Night: Werdum vs. Tybura. He lost the fight via split decision.

On December 20, 2017, Means announced he had signed a new, five-fight contract with UFC.

Means faced Sérgio Moraes on February 3, 2018, at UFC Fight Night: Machida vs. Anders. He lost the fight via split decision. Means was given win bonus.

Means faced Ricky Rainey on November 30, 2018, at The Ultimate Fighter 28 Finale. He won the fight via a technical knockout in round one.

Means faced Niko Price on March 9, 2019, at UFC Fight Night 146. He lost the fight via knockout in the first round, marking the first time he's been stopped due to strikes.

In the last fight of his prevailing contract, Means faced Thiago Alves on December 7, 2019, at UFC on ESPN 7. He won the fight via a submission in round one. Means signed a new contract with the UFC in the following week.

Means was scheduled to face Ramazan Emeev on February 15, 2020, at UFC Fight Night 167. However, Emeev was removed from the bout in late-January for undisclosed reasons and replaced by Daniel Rodriguez. Means lost the fight via submission in the second round. Means dedicated his fight to two teenage boys who had died in a car crash in his community. He had a special mouth piece made in their honor and claimed to had "fought his hardest" for them that night.

Means faced Laureano Staropoli on August 8, 2020, at UFC Fight Night 174. At the weigh-ins, Staropoli weighed in at 174.5 pounds, three and a half pounds over the welterweight non-title fight limit. The bout proceeded at a catchweight and Stropoli was fined 20% of his purse, which went to Means. He won the fight via unanimous decision.

Means replaced Robbie Lawler to face Mike Perry on November 21, 2020, at UFC 255. At the weigh-ins on November 20, Perry missed weight, weighing in at 175.5 pounds, over the non-title welterweight limit of 171.0 pounds. As a result, the bout proceeded at a catchweight and Perry was fined 30 percent of his purse, which went to Means. Means won the fight via unanimous decision.

Means was scheduled to face Danny Roberts on June 19, 2021, at UFC on ESPN 25. However, Roberts was removed from the pairing due to COVID-19 protocols in the days leading up to the event. Subsequently Means was shifted to face Nicolas Dalby at UFC Fight Night 190 on June 26, 2021. Means won the fight via unanimous decision.

Means faced Kevin Holland on June 18, 2022, at UFC on ESPN 37. He lost the bout in the second round after getting submitted with a D'arce choke.

Means faced Max Griffin on October 29, 2022, at UFC Fight Night 213. He lost the fight via a split decision.

Championships and accomplishments 
Ultimate Fighting Championship
 Performance of the Night (Two times)
King of the Cage
KOTC Lightweight Champion (One time)
KOTC Junior Welterweight Champion (One time)
Two successful title defenses

Mixed martial arts record

|-
|Loss
|align=center|32–14–1 (1)
|Max Griffin
|Decision (split)
|UFC Fight Night: Kattar vs. Allen
|
|align=center|3
|align=center|5:00
|Las Vegas, Nevada, United States
|
|-
|Loss
|align=center|32–13–1 (1)
|Kevin Holland
|Submission (D’Arce choke)
|UFC on ESPN: Kattar vs. Emmett
|
|align=center|2
|align=center|1:28
|Austin, Texas, United States
|
|-
|Win
|align=center|32–12–1 (1)
|Nicolas Dalby
|Decision (unanimous)
|UFC Fight Night: Gane vs. Volkov
|
|align=center|3
|align=center|5:00
|Las Vegas, Nevada, United States
|
|-
|Win
|align=center|31–12–1 (1)
|Mike Perry 
|Decision (unanimous)
|UFC 255
|
|align=center|3
|align=center|5:00
|Las Vegas, Nevada, United States
|
|-
|Win
|align=center|30–12–1 (1)
|Laureano Staropoli
|Decision (unanimous)
|UFC Fight Night: Lewis vs. Oleinik 
|
|align=center|3
|align=center|5:00
|Las Vegas, Nevada, United States
|
|-
|Loss
|align=center|29–12–1 (1)
|Daniel Rodriguez
|Submission (guillotine choke)
|UFC Fight Night: Anderson vs. Błachowicz 2 
|
|align=center|2
|align=center|3:37
|Rio Rancho, New Mexico, United States
|
|-
|Win
|align=center|29–11–1 (1)
|Thiago Alves
|Submission (guillotine choke)
|UFC on ESPN: Overeem vs. Rozenstruik 
|
|align=center|1
|align=center|2:38
|Washington, D.C., United States
|
|-
|Loss
|align=center|28–11–1 (1)
|Niko Price
|KO (punches)
|UFC Fight Night: Lewis vs. dos Santos 
|
|align=center|1
|align=center|4:50
|Wichita, Kansas, United States
|
|-
|Win
|align=center|28–10–1 (1)
|Ricky Rainey
|TKO (punches)
|The Ultimate Fighter: Heavy Hitters Finale 
|
|align=center|1
|align=center|1:18
|Las Vegas, Nevada, United States
|  
|-
|Loss
|align=center| (1)
|Sérgio Moraes
|Decision (split)
|UFC Fight Night: Machida vs. Anders 
|
|align=center|3
|align=center|5:00
|Belém, Brazil
|
|-
|Loss
|align=center|27–9–1 (1)
|Belal Muhammad
|Decision (split)
|UFC Fight Night: Werdum vs. Tybura
|
|align=center|3
|align=center|5:00
|Sydney, Australia
|
|-
|Win
|align=center|27–8–1 (1)
|Alex Garcia
|Decision (unanimous)
|UFC Fight Night: Chiesa vs. Lee
|
|align=center|3
|align=center|5:00
|Oklahoma City, Oklahoma, United States
|
|-
|Loss
|align=center|26–8–1 (1)
|Alex Oliveira
|Submission (rear-naked choke) 
|UFC Fight Night: Belfort vs. Gastelum
|
|align=center|2
|align=center|2:38
|Fortaleza, Brazil
|
|-
|NC
|align=center|26–7–1 (1)
|Alex Oliveira
|NC (illegal knees)
|UFC 207
|
|align=center|1
|align=center|3:33
|Las Vegas, Nevada, United States
|
|-
| Win
| align=center| 26–7–1
| Sabah Homasi
| TKO (punches)
| UFC 202 
| 
| align=center|2
| align=center|2:56
| Las Vegas, Nevada, United States
|  
|-
| Win
| align=center| 25–7–1
| John Howard
| KO (punch)
| UFC Fight Night: Namajunas vs. VanZant
| 
| align=center|2
| align=center|0:21
| Las Vegas, Nevada, United States
| 
|-
| Loss
| align=center| 24–7–1
| Matt Brown
| Submission (guillotine choke)
| UFC 189 
| 
| align=center| 1
| align=center| 4:44
| Las Vegas, Nevada, United States
| 
|-
| Win
| align=center| 24–6–1
| George Sullivan
| Submission (arm-triangle choke)
| UFC on Fox: Machida vs. Rockhold 
| 
| align=center| 3
| align=center| 3:41
| Newark, New Jersey, United States
| 
|-
| Win
| align=center| 23–6–1
| Dhiego Lima
| TKO (punches)
| UFC 184
| 
| align=center| 1
| align=center| 2:17
| Los Angeles, California, United States
| 
|-
| Win
| align=center| 22–6–1
| Márcio Alexandre Jr.
| Decision (split)
| UFC Fight Night: Machida vs. Dollaway
| 
| align=center| 3
| align=center| 5:00
| Barueri, Brazil
| 
|-
| Win
| align=center| 21–6–1
| Hernani Perpétuo
| Decision (unanimous)
| UFC on Fox: Lawler vs. Brown
| 
| align=center| 3
| align=center| 5:00
| San Jose, California, United States
| 
|-
| Loss
| align=center| 20–6–1
| Neil Magny
| Decision (unanimous)
| UFC Fight Night: Brown vs. Silva
| 
| align=center| 3
| align=center| 5:00
| Cincinnati, Ohio, United States
| 
|-
| Win
| align=center| 20–5–1
| Artenas Young
| TKO (punches)
| Legacy FC 27
| 
| align=center| 1
| align=center| 1:38
| Houston, Texas, United States
| 
|-
| Win
| align=center| 19–5–1
| Pete Spratt
| KO (elbows and punches)
| Legacy FC 23
| 
| align=center| 1
| align=center| 2:24
| San Antonio, Texas, United States
|  
|-
| Loss
| align=center| 18–5–1
| Danny Castillo
| Decision (unanimous)
| UFC on Fox: Johnson vs. Moraga
| 
| align=center| 3
| align=center| 5:00
| Seattle, Washington, United States
|  
|-
| Loss
| align=center| 18–4–1
| Jorge Masvidal
| Decision (unanimous)
| UFC on Fox: Henderson vs. Melendez
| 
| align=center| 3
| align=center| 5:00
| San Jose, California, United States
| 
|-
| Win
| align=center| 18–3–1 
| Justin Salas
| TKO (knee and punches)
| UFC on FX: Johnson vs. McCall
| 
| align=center| 1
| align=center| 1:06
| Sunrise, Florida, United States
| 
|-
| Win
| align=center| 17–3–1
| Bernardo Magalhães
| Decision (unanimous)
| UFC on Fuel TV: Sanchez vs. Ellenberger
| 
| align=center| 3
| align=center| 5:00
| Omaha, Nebraska, United States
|
|-
| Win
| align=center| 16–3–1
| Tye Brown
| TKO (punches)
| KOTC: Total Destruction
| 
| align=center| 1
| align=center| 0:30
| Thackerville, Oklahoma, United States
| 
|-
| Win
| align=center| 15–3–1
| Mario Ramos
| TKO (punches)
| KOTC: High Performance
| 
| align=center| 1
| align=center| 1:07
| Santa Fe, New Mexico, United States
| 
|-
| Win
| align=center| 14–3–1
| Cody Pfister
| Submission (rear-naked choke)
| KOTC: Kingpin
| 
| align=center| 1
| align=center| 2:15
| Lubbock, Texas, United States
| 
|-
| Win
| align=center| 13–3–1
| Cris Leyva
| TKO (knees and punches)
| KOTC: Fight to Live
| 
| align=center| 3
| align=center| 1:28
| Santa Fe, New Mexico, United States
| 
|-
| Win
| align=center| 12–3–1
| Ricky Musgrave
| KO (punches)
| ECSC: Friday Night Fights 2
| 
| align=center| 3
| align=center| 4:53
| Clovis, New Mexico, United States
| 
|-
| Win
| align=center| 11–3–1
| Dom O'Grady
| Decision (split)
| KOTC: Steel
| 
| align=center| 5
| align=center| 5:00
| San Bernardino, California, United States
| 
|-
| Win
| align=center| 
| Bobby Green
| TKO (retirement)
| KOTC: Inferno
| 
| align=center| 2
| align=center| 5:00
| Highland, California, United States
| 
|-
| Draw
| align=center| 9–3–1
| Dom O'Grady
| Draw (majority)
| KOTC: Lock Down
| 
| align=center| 3
| align=center| 5:00
| Edmonton, Alberta, Canada
| 
|-
| Win
| align=center| 9–3
| Cody Garlett
| TKO (punches)
| KOTC: Honor
| 
| align=center| 1
| align=center| 1:17
| Mescalero, New Mexico, United States
| 
|-
| Loss
| align=center| 8–3
| Jaime Jara
| Submission (guillotine choke)
| KOTC: Legacy
| 
| align=center| 1
| align=center| 2:19
| Reno, Nevada, United States
| 
|-
| Win
| align=center| 8–2
| John Cronk
| Submission (rear-naked choke)
| KOTC: Horse Power
| 
| align=center| 1
| align=center| 0:46
| Mescalero, New Mexico, United States
| 
|-
| Win
| align=center| 7–2
| Marcio Navarro
| TKO (punches)
| KOTC: Gunslinger
| 
| align=center| 1
| align=center| 3:53
| Concho, Oklahoma, United States
| 
|-
| Win
| align=center| 6–2
| Matt Butterfield
| KO (knee)
| KOTC: El Lobo
| 
| align=center| 1
| align=center| 0:04
| Towaoc, Colorado, United States
| 
|-
| Win
| align=center| 5–2
| Matt Green
| TKO (punches)
| KOTC: New Breed
| 
| align=center| 1
| align=center| 0:09
| Mescalero, New Mexico, United States
| 
|-
| Win
| align=center| 4–2
| Brad Nordquist
| KO (punches)
| KOTC: Rapture
| 
| align=center| 1
| align=center| 2:07
| Towaoc, Colorado, United States
| 
|-
| Win
| align=center| 3–2
| July Guiterrez
| Submission (rear-naked choke)
| Fightworld 4
| 
| align=center| N/A
| align=center| N/A
| Albuquerque, New Mexico, United States
| 
|-
| Loss
| align=center| 2–2
| Spencer Fisher
| Submission (triangle choke)
| IFC: Eve Of Destruction
| 
| align=center| 1
| align=center| 1:44
| Salt Lake City, Utah, United States
| 
|-
| Loss
| align=center| 2–1
| Luke Caudillo
| TKO (injury)
| Ring of Fire 13
| 
| align=center| 1
| align=center| 1:40
| Castle Rock, Colorado, United States
| 
|-
| Win
| align=center| 2–0
| Nathan Brown
| TKO (punches)
| Extreme Fighting Championships 2
| 
| align=center| 1
| align=center| N/A
| Ardmore, Oklahoma, United States
| 
|-
| Win
| align=center| 1–0
| Josh Barlowe
| TKO (punches)
| Rumble in the Desert
| 
| align=center| N/A
| align=center| N/A
| Grand Junction, Colorado, United States
|

Professional boxing record

See also
 List of current UFC fighters
 List of male mixed martial artists

References

External links

Living people
American male mixed martial artists
American sportspeople in doping cases
American sportspeople convicted of crimes
Doping cases in mixed martial arts
Lightweight mixed martial artists
Mixed martial artists utilizing boxing
Mixed martial artists from Oklahoma
1984 births
People from Latimer County, Oklahoma
People from Moriarty, New Mexico
Sportspeople from Albuquerque, New Mexico
Mixed martial artists from New Mexico
Ultimate Fighting Championship male fighters